Jacob Davis  may refer to:
Jacob C. Davis (1820–1883), American politician (Illinois) and criminal defendant
Jacob E. Davis (1905–2003), American politician (Ohio)
Jacob W. Davis (1831–1908), Latvian-American entrepreneur
Jacob Davis Babcock Stillman

See also
Jake Davis (disambiguation)